The Game Wave Family Entertainment System, commonly abbreviated as Game Wave, is a hybrid DVD player and home video game console manufactured by ZAPiT Games. It is part of the seventh generation of video game consoles.

History
In October 2004 the first Game Wave prototype system was made.

It was first released in Canada in October 2005. It was released in the United States at an MSRP of $99. It was packaged with the pack-in game 4 Degrees: The Arc of Trivia, Vol. 1 (later changed to VeggieTales: Veg-Out! Family Tournament).

Because of the use of family friendly games and a partnership with VeggieTales, the system found some success with Christian households.

The system was discontinued in 2009. A followup console had been planned for 2009.

Hardware 

The Game Wave was packaged with both RCA and S-Video cables, along with 4 IR-based wireless controllers (modeled after typical DVD remote controllers) and a case that holds up to 6 controllers. The case and console are designed to sit side-by-side on a shelf to form a complete wave shape.

The primary processor of the system is the Mediamatics 8611, which is coupled with 16 megabytes of SRAM and 2 megabytes of NOR flash memory storage. An Altera MAX II CPLD is also used. An Atmel serial EEPROM is used for save data. The system uses a dedicated 2 channel audio DAC in order to avoid royalties for the one integrated in the Mediamatics processor.

Game software for the Game Wave Family Entertainment System is typically scripted in Lua.

The system can operate as a typical DVD player.

Controllers 

The Game Wave controller has 4-directional navigational buttons used for menu navigation and DVD playback control. The controller has 4 alphabetical buttons along the top labeled "A", "B", "C", and "D" designed primarily for selecting responses in trivia games. A numeric keypad lines the bottom of the controller with Menu and Setup buttons.

The Game Wave controllers came in 6 colors: blue, yellow, green, red, purple, and orange. Blue, yellow, green, and red come packaged with the console, whereas the purple and orange controllers could be purchased separately for an MSRP of $30. Each controller color has a different IR beat frequency, allowing the console to differentiate the different controllers for multiplayer gameplay for up to 6 players (if the game in question supports it).

Games 
Due to the shape of the controller and marketing concerns for a "Family Entertainment System," no heavily action-based game genres are present within the Game Wave's 13 game library. Rather, the software library consists mainly of trivia and puzzle games. In addition, many Game Wave games are heavily inspired by other video games and TV shows. A 14th game, Quiz Konnect was developed for the India market.

References

External links
  (Archived)
Game Wave - Video Game Review at Common Sense Media

Seventh-generation video game consoles
Home video game consoles
Products introduced in 2005
DVD interactive technology
Discontinued video game consoles
Video gaming in Canada